Russell Whiston Kerr (1 February 1921 – 15 November 1983), was an Australian-born British Labour Party politician.

Early life
Kerr was born in Sydney, and was educated at the Shore School, the Sydney Church of England Grammar School, and Sydney University. He served with the Pathfinder Force of the Royal Air Force during World War II, and moved to England in 1948. He became a director of the Town and Country Planning Association and an air charter executive. In 1950, he became a member of the British Labour Party, having previously been a member of the Australian Labor Party from 1938. He was a national executive member of the Association of Supervisory Staff, Executives and Technicians from 1964.

Parliamentary career
Kerr contested Horsham in 1951, Merton and Morden in 1959 and Preston North in 1964.

He was Member of Parliament for Feltham from 1966 to 1974, and for Feltham and Heston from 1974 to 1983. He lost his seat in that year's landslide defeat for Labour, to the Conservative Patrick Ground. He was a democratic socialist and was named chairman of the Tribune Group in 1969.

Personal life and death
In 1946, Kerr married Shirley Huie in Australia; they had two children and later divorced. He was married to Anne Kerr from 1960 to her death 1973. She was a Labour MP Rochester and Chatham from 1964 to 1970.

On 15 November 1983, after a period of declining health, Kerr died in Twickenham, at the wheel of his car. He was 62.

External links

References

Times Guide to the House of Commons, 1966 & 1983

1921 births
1983 deaths
Australian emigrants to England
Australian expatriates in England
English socialists
English trade unionists
European democratic socialists
Labour Party (UK) MPs for English constituencies
Politicians from Sydney
Royal Air Force personnel of World War II
UK MPs 1966–1970
UK MPs 1970–1974
UK MPs 1974
UK MPs 1974–1979
UK MPs 1979–1983
University of Sydney alumni